Damouzy is a commune in the Ardennes department in northern France.

Geography
The river Sormonne forms part of the commune's southern border.

Population

See also
Communes of the Ardennes department

References

Communes of Ardennes (department)
Ardennes communes articles needing translation from French Wikipedia